WFBA (90.5 FM) is an American non-commercial educational radio station licensed to serve the community of Kulpmont, Pennsylvania and the larger surrounding communities of Shamokin and Frackville. The station's broadcast license is held by Beaver Springs Faith Baptist Church, Inc.

WFBA broadcasts a Southern Gospel music format. It is part of a simulcast with 90.5 WFBM of Beaver Springs and 90.1 WFBV of Selinsgrove.

History
WFBA 90.5 FM first applied to the U.S. Federal Communications Commission (FCC) for a construction permit in 2009 and it was granted in 2010 to the Apostolic Faith Network, Inc. On August 9, 2013 it was transferred to Beaver Springs Faith Baptist Church, Inc. WFBA was officially assigned its call sign on July 13, 2011.

References

External links
Official website

Southern Gospel radio stations in the United States
Radio stations established in 2013
Northumberland County, Pennsylvania
2013 establishments in Pennsylvania
FBA